Ragozin or Ragosin is a Russian male surname, its feminine counterpart is Ragozina or Ragosina. It may refer to
Natascha Ragosina (born 1976), Kazakhstani professional boxer
Nikki Ragozin Keddie (born 1930), American historian of Iran and Middle Eastern women
Roman Ragozin (born 1993), Kazakhstani cross-country skier
Tatyana Ragozina (born 1964), Ukrainian race walker
Viacheslav Ragozin (1908–1962), Soviet chess grandmaster
Zénaïde Alexeïevna Ragozin (1835–1924), Russian-American author

See also
Rogozin
Rogozhin